William Chillenden, (died 1274) also known as Adam of Chillenden, was a monk at Christ Church Priory, Canterbury, and treasurer of that priory when he was elected Prior of Christ Church in 1263 (or 1264).

Chillenden was elected to be Archbishop of Canterbury in England on 9 September 1270. King Edward I, however, had wanted his Chancellor Robert Burnell elected. Chillenden's election was set aside by the pope in the summer of 1272 and he never received his pallium.

Chillenden died on 13 September 1274.

Citations

References

 
 
 

Archbishops of Canterbury
13th-century Roman Catholic bishops
Priors of Canterbury
1274 deaths
Year of birth unknown